Jack Varaleau (22 May 1922 – 27 November 2004) was a Canadian weightlifter. He competed at the 1948 Summer Olympics and the 1952 Summer Olympics.

References

External links
 

1922 births
2004 deaths
Canadian male weightlifters
Olympic weightlifters of Canada
Weightlifters at the 1948 Summer Olympics
Weightlifters at the 1952 Summer Olympics
Sportspeople from Ottawa
Commonwealth Games gold medallists for Canada
Commonwealth Games medallists in weightlifting
Weightlifters at the 1950 British Empire Games
20th-century Canadian people
21st-century Canadian people
Medallists at the 1950 British Empire Games